The Tampere Police Station (or the Tampere Central Police Station;) is a police station located in the Ratina district in Tampere, Finland, and also the administrative center of the . The police station is also used by the Finnish Security Intelligence Service (SUPO). There are about 400 police officers working there and about 50 others. The police station consists of two buildings located near the Tampere Bus Station along the Hatanpää Highway and Sorinkatu streets; due to this, in Tampere colloquially, the police station and its surroundings are also known as Sori by locals.

The station is owned by Senate Properties.

History
The oldest, three-storey building of the police building was designed by architect  and was completed on the Hatanpää Highway in 1963. The five-storey part on Sorinkatu dates from 1993 and was designed by architect . The old and new sides of the police station are connected by gateways that run under and over Sorinkatu.

In 1919–1963, before the completion of the current premises, the Tampere Police Station operated in the building of the former  (Kaupunginhotelli) on the Kauppakatu street.

See also
 List of police departments in Finland
 Tampere Central Fire Station
 Tampere University Hospital

Sources

References

External links
 Tampere Main Police Station at the official site of the Police of Finland
 Licence services
 Lost property
 Police matters
 Sorin poliisiasema (Komisario Koskisen Tampere) at Visit Tampere (in Finnish)

Buildings and structures in Tampere
Keskusta (Tampere)
Law enforcement in Finland
Police stations